Karin Elisabeth Westman (born 17 May 1966) is a road cyclist from Sweden. She represented her nation at the 1992 Summer Olympics in the women's road race.

References

External links
 profile at sports-reference.com

Swedish female cyclists
Cyclists at the 1992 Summer Olympics
Olympic cyclists of Sweden
Living people
Sportspeople from Västerås
1966 births